Santa Maria Maior may refer to the following places in Portugal:

Santa Maria Maior (Chaves), a parish in the municipality of Chaves
Santa Maria Maior (Lisbon), a parish in the municipality of Lisbon 
Santa Maria Maior (Viana do Castelo), a parish in the municipality of Viana do Castelo 
Santa Maria Maior (Funchal), a parish in the municipality of Funchal, Madeira